Tony Pantano (January 20, 1948 – January 7, 2023) was an Italian-born Australian musician, singer, songwriter, and actor.

Early years and bands
Tony Pantano was born in Messina, Italy and arrived in Australia with his parents in 1956.

At the age of 12, Tony worked with his father at local Italian dances and weddings, playing slap bass and singing. At the age of 15 he formed his own pop group Isy and the Dynamics. Isy and the Dynamics recorded the single "One Night/Let Bygones Begone" on the In label in 1965.

Pantano changed his style from pop to Latin American when he joined the group Sammy and The Dolphins as their lead vocalist and bass player. Sammy and The Dolphins released the one extended play titled, The Dolphins At Sergio's Rendezvous, recorded at the Allan Eaton Recording Studios in Melbourne. Following this release, Tony did a tour of Vietnam entertaining the troops. On his return to Australia he entered the talent show Showcase and won his way to the Grand Final.

Solo career
Pantano's first single "Every Time You Touch Me" was released in 1971 on the Air label and reached the Australian top 40.

A second single "Tonight" was released on the His Master's Voice label and peaked at number 80 on the Australian charts.

Personal life and death
Pantano was the grandfather of Australian comedian and Australia's Got Talent semi-finalist JJ Pantano.

On 7 January 2023, it was announced that Pantano had died from cancer, at the age of 74.

Discography

Albums

Charting singles

Awards

Mo Awards
The Australian Entertainment Mo Awards (commonly known informally as the Mo Awards), were annual Australian entertainment industry awards. They recognise achievements in live entertainment in Australia from 1975 to 2016. Pantano won 11 awards in that time.
 (wins only)
|-
| 1975
| Tony Pantano
| Male Vocal of the Year
| 
|-
| 1983
| Tony Pantano
| Male Vocal of the Year
| 
|-
| 1984
| Tony Pantano
| Male Vocal Entertainer of the Year
| 
|-
| 1986
| Tony Pantano
| Male Vocal Entertainer of the Year
| 
|-
|rowspan="2"| 1989
| Tony Pantano
| Cabaret Performer of the Year
| 
|-
| Tony Pantano
| Male Vocal Cabaret Entertainer of the Year
| 
|-
| 1990
| Tony Pantano
| Cabaret Performer of the Year
| 
|-
| 2006
| Tony Pantano
| Ricky May Male Vocal Performer of the Year
| 
|-
| 2008
| Tony Pantano
| Ricky May Male Vocal Performer of the Year
| 
|-
| 2009
| Tony Pantano
| Ricky May Male Vocal Performer of the Year
| 
|-
| 2012
| Tony Pantano
| Ricky May Male Vocal Performer of the Year
| 
|-

References

External links
 
 

1948 births
2023 deaths
Australian male actors
Australian male guitarists
Australian male singer-songwriters
Italian emigrants to Australia
Deaths from cancer in Australia